William Henry Kay (born January 10, 1960) is a former professional American football player who played defensive back for four seasons for the  Houston Oilers, San Diego Chargers, and St. Louis Cardinals He played college football at Purdue University (1977–1981). Kay was a defensive back and a four-year Varsity P Club award winner. He played high school football at Proviso East High School in Maywood, Illinois. He was coached by former Boilermakers Joe Krupa and Mike Williams. Kay was drafted in sixth round of the 1981 NFL Draft by the Oilers.

References

1960 births
Players of American football from Detroit
American football cornerbacks
Purdue Boilermakers football players
St. Louis Cardinals (football) players
Houston Oilers players
San Diego Chargers players
Living people